The 2011 St. Paul Cash Spiel was held from October 13 to 16 at the St. Paul Curling Club in St. Paul, Minnesota, as part of the 2011–12 World Curling Tour. The purses for the men's and women's events were USD$13,500 and USD$7,200, respectively. The event was held in a round robin format.

Men

Teams

Round Robin standings

Playoffs

Women

Teams

Round Robin standings

Playoffs

External links
Home Page

2011 in curling
Curling in Minnesota